In complex analysis, Jordan's lemma is a result frequently used in conjunction with the residue theorem to evaluate contour integrals and improper integrals. The lemma is named after the French mathematician Camille Jordan.

Statement 

Consider a complex-valued, continuous function , defined on a semicircular contour

of positive radius  lying in the upper half-plane, centered at the origin. If the function  is of the form

with a positive parameter , then Jordan's lemma states the following upper bound for the contour integral:

with equality when  vanishes everywhere, in which case both sides are identically zero. An analogous statement for a semicircular contour in the lower half-plane holds when .

Remarks 

 If  is continuous on the semicircular contour  for all large  and

then by Jordan's lemma 
 For the case , see the estimation lemma.
 Compared to the estimation lemma, the upper bound in Jordan's lemma does not explicitly depend on the length of the contour .

Application of Jordan's lemma 

Consider the closed contour , which is the concatenation of the paths  and  shown in the picture. By definition,

Since on  the variable  is real, the second integral is real:

Hence, if  satisfies condition, then taking the limit as  tends to infinity, the contour integral over  vanishes by Jordan's lemma and we get the value of the improper integral

Example 

The function

hence holds.

so that

This result exemplifies the way some integrals difficult to compute with classical methods are easily evaluated with the help of complex analysis.

This example shows that Jordan's lemma can be used instead of a much simpler estimation lemma.

Proof of Jordan's lemma 

By definition of the complex line integral,

Now the inequality

yields

for all , which further implies

See also
Estimation lemma

References
 

Theorems in complex analysis
Articles containing proofs
Lemmas in analysis